Bacterial neuraminidase is type of neuraminidase and a virulence factor for many bacteria including Bacteroides fragilis and Pseudomonas aeruginosa.
Its function is to cleave a sialic acid residue off ganglioside-GM1 (a modulator of cell surface and receptor activity) turning it into asialo-GM1 to which type 4 pili (attachment factors) bind preferentially.

References

EC 3.2.1
Virulence factors